Marcelo González may refer to:

 Marcelo González Martín (1918-2004), Cardinal of the Roman Catholic Church
 Marcelo González (luger) (born 1965), Argentine luger
 Marcelo González Godoy (born 1963), Chilean association football commentator